Administrative Council elections were held in Dahomey in 1930.

Electoral system
Three members of the Administrative Council were elected from single-member constituencies; Abomey, Ouidah and Porto-Novo. However, the franchise was extremely restricted.

Campaign
In Porto-Novo, Augustin Nicoué ran against the incumbent Casimir d'Almeida. D'Almeida was supported by the La Voix newspaper, whilst Nicoué was supported by Le Phare du Dahomey.

Results
Despite Nicoué's campaign, Casimir d'Almeida was re-elected.

References

1930 elections in Africa
1930
1930 in French Dahomey
1930